Gaby Larrivée (born 4 February 1933 in Quebec City, Quebec) was a member of the House of Commons of Canada from 1988 to 1993. His background was in business.

He was elected in the 1988 federal election at the Joliette electoral district for the Progressive Conservative party. He served in the 34th Canadian Parliament after which he was defeated by Bloc Québécois candidate René Laurin in the 1993 federal election.

External links

1933 births
French Quebecers
Living people
Members of the House of Commons of Canada from Quebec
Politicians from Quebec City
Progressive Conservative Party of Canada MPs